= Los Talas, Catamarca =

Coordinates: 27°58′S 65°52′W

Los Talas (Catamarca)
- Municipality and village
- Interactive map of Los Talas (Catamarca)
- Country: Argentina
- Province: Catamarca Province
- Time zone: UTC−3 (ART)

Los Talas (Catamarca) is a village and municipality in Catamarca Province in northwestern Argentina.
